Chmielnicki may refer to:

 Bohdan Khmelnytsky ( – 1657), Ukrainian head of state and military commander
 Khmelnytsky Uprising,  a Cossack rebellion within the Polish-Lithuanian Commonwealth in 1648–1657 led by Bohdan Khmelnytsky
 Khmelnytskyi, Ukraine, a city in central Ukraine

 Khmelnytsky (disambiguation)